The Pocono Northeast Classic was a golf tournament on the LPGA Tour, played only in 1977. It was played at the Pocono Manor Golf Course in Pocono Manor, Pennsylvania. Debbie Austin won the tournament by one stroke over Sandra Post.

References

Former LPGA Tour events
Golf in Pennsylvania
History of women in Pennsylvania